Steven Choong Shiau Yoon (born 7 December 1957) is a Malaysian politician who served as Member of Parliament (MP) for Tebrau from May 2018 to November 2022. He is a member of the Parti Bangsa Malaysia (PBM) and was an independent MP supporting the ruling Perikatan Nasional (PN) coalition and member of the People's Justice Party (PKR), a component party of the Pakatan Harapan (PH) opposition coalition.

Early life and education
Choong was born on 7 December 1957 at Beruas, Perak. He went to Sekolah Menengah Teknik, Ipoh. He graduated with a Master's Degree in Business Finance at Brunel University London.

Background
Choong has a vast experience as an accountant, auditor, tax agent and business consultant career. He is a Partner at CSY & Associates PLT beside Managing Director and CEO at CSY Tax Services Sdn. Bhd. He also serves as a Senior Independent Non-Executive Director on the board of Country View Bhd since 27 March 2002. He is also the Chairman for Malaysian Institute of Accountants, Chartered Member at Institute of Internal Auditors Malaysia and Member of Association of Chartered Certified Accountants.

Politics career
Choong chose to participate in politics by joining People's Justice Party (PKR) at the age of 50 in 2007. He has been the Division Chairman of both Tebrau and Ayer Hitam and Deputy Secretary-General of PKR. He made his debut contesting the Tebrau parliamentary seat in the 2013 elections but had lost by 1,767 votes to the Malaysian Chinese Association (MCA) candidate. In the 2018 elections, he contested Tebrau under the People's Justice Party banner again in a three-cornered fight and this time won by defeating candidates from the MCA and the Pan-Malaysian Islamic Party (PAS).

On 28 February 2021, he was sacked from PKR to be an independent MP friendly to Prime Minister Muhyiddin Yassin's ruling Perikatan Nasional (PN) coalition together with Larry Sng. The two MPs announced formation of Parti Bangsa Malaysia (PBM) on 19 November 2021.

Election results

See also
Tebrau (federal constituency)

External links

References

Living people
1957 births
People from Perak
People from Ipoh
Malaysian politicians of Chinese descent
Malaysian accountants
Malaysian businesspeople
Independent politicians in Malaysia
Former People's Justice Party (Malaysia) politicians
Members of the Dewan Rakyat
Alumni of Brunel University London
21st-century Malaysian politicians